Dumbrăvița is a commune in Maramureș County, Romania, 15 kilometers southeast of Baia Mare. It is composed of six villages: Cărbunari (Kővárfüred), Chechiș (Oláhkékes), Dumbrăvița, Rus (Kékesoroszfalu), Sindrești (Felsősándorfalu) and Unguraș (Magyarkékes).

References

Communes in Maramureș County